In mathematics, specifically functional analysis, a series is unconditionally convergent if all reorderings of the series converge to the same value. In contrast, a series is conditionally convergent if it converges but different orderings do not all converge to that same value. Unconditional convergence is equivalent to absolute convergence in finite-dimensional vector spaces, but is a weaker property in infinite dimensions.

Definition

Let  be a topological vector space.

The series  is called unconditionally convergent to   if
 the indexing set  is countable, and
 for every permutation (bijection)  of  the following relation holds:

Alternative definition
Unconditional convergence is often defined in an equivalent way: A series is unconditionally convergent if for every sequence  with  the series

converges.

If  is a Banach space, every absolutely convergent series is unconditionally convergent, but the converse implication does not hold in general. Indeed, if  is an infinite-dimensional Banach space, then by Dvoretzky–Rogers theorem there always exists an unconditionally convergent series in this space that is not absolutely convergent. However when  by the Riemann series theorem, the series  is unconditionally convergent if and only if it is absolutely convergent.

See also

References

 Ch. Heil: A Basis Theory Primer
 
 

Convergence (mathematics)
Mathematical analysis
Mathematical series
Summability theory